August 7 - Eastern Orthodox liturgical calendar - August 9

All fixed commemorations below are observed on August 21 by Eastern Orthodox Churches on the Old Calendar.

For August 8, Orthodox Churches on the Old Calendar commemorate the Saints listed on July 26.

Feasts

 Afterfeast of the Transfiguration of Our Lord, God, and Savior Jesus Christ.

Saints

 Saint Myron the Wonderworker, Archbishop of Crete (350)
 Martyrs Eleutherius and Leonides, of Constantinople, and many infants with them, by fire (4th century)
 Martyr Gormizdas (Hormisdas) of Persia (418)
 The Ten Venerable ascetics of Egypt.
 The two martyrs of Tyre, dragged to death.
 Martyr Styracius, by the sword.
 Saint Emilian the Confessor, Bishop of Cyzicus (820)  (see also: January 8)

Pre-Schism Western saints

 Saints Cyriacus, Largus, Smaragdus and Companions, a group of twenty-four martyrs who suffered in Rome under Diocletian (304)
 Saint Severus, a priest who came from India to enlighten the area around Vienne in France (c. 445)
 Saint Leobald (Leodebod, Leodebaldus), founder of Fleury Abbey, later called Saint-Benoît-sur-Loire, near Orleans in France (650)
 Saint Mummolus (Mommolus, Mommolenus), second Abbot of Fleury in France (c. 678)
 Saint Sigrada, mother of Sts Leodegarius and Warinus, nun at the convent in Soissons in France (c. 678)
 Saint Ternatius (Terniscus), eleventh Bishop of Besançon in the east of France (c. 680)
 Saint Ellidius (Illog), Patron-saint of Hirnant in Powys in Wales and of a church in the Scilly Isles (7th century)
 Saint Gedeon, the thirteenth Bishop of Besançon in France (796)
 Saint Ultan, priest at the monastery of St Peter in Crayke in Yorkshire (8th century)
 Saint Rathard (Rathard von Andechs), a noble who became a priest and founded the monastery of Diessen (Dießen-Andechs) in Germany (815)

Post-Schism Orthodox saints

 Venerable Theodosius the New, Igumen of Orov.
 Venerable Gregory, Iconographer, of the Kiev Caves (12th century)
 Venerable Gregory of Sinai (Mt. Athos) (1346)
 Saint Zosimas the Sinaite, of Tumana Monastery, Serbia (14th century)
 Saint Gregory, Wonderworker, of the Kiev Caves (14th century)
 New Martyr Triantaphyllos of Zagora, Thessaly, at Constantinople (1680)
 New Martyr Anastasius (Spaso) of Radovishte in Strumica, at Thessaloniki (1794)
 Monkmartyr Euthymius, Abbot of the Monastery of St. John the Baptist, at David Gareja monastery complex, Georgia (1804)
 Saint Philaret of Ichalka, Ivanovo (1913)
 Saint Kallinikos (Poulos) of Edessa, Metropolitan of Edessa, Pella and Almopia (el) (1984)

New martyrs and confessors

 New Hieromartyr Joseph (Baranov), Hieromonk of the Tolga Monastery (Yaroslavl) (1918)
 New Hieromartyr Nicholas Shumkov, Priest (1937)
 New Hieromartyr Nicodemus (Krotkov), Archbishop of Kostroma and Galich (1938)  <small>(see also: January 23)</small>

Other commemorations

 Consecration of the Church of the Apostles Peter and Paul, in the year 891 AD (6399 AM), in reign of Leo VI the Wise, when there occurred a solar eclipse from the sixth to the ninth hours. Aνάμνηση των εγκαινίων των Αγίων Αποστόλων Πέτρου και Παύλου. Ορθόδοξος Συναξαριστής. 08/08/2014.
 Consecration of the Church of the Most Holy Theotokos in Jerusalem.
 "Tolga" Icon of the Most Holy Theotokos (1314)Icon of the Mother of God of Tolga. OCA - Lives of the Saints.
 First (1566) and second (1992) translations of the relics of Sts. Zosimas (1478) and Sabbatius (1435), of Solovki.
 Translation of the relics (1992) of St. Herman of Solovki (1479)
 Uncovering of the relics (2002) of St. Barlaam of Chikoisk Monastery (Siberia) (1846)

Icon gallery

Notes

References

Sources
 August 8 / August 21. Orthodox Calendar (PRAVOSLAVIE.RU).
 August 21 / August 8. HOLY TRINITY RUSSIAN ORTHODOX CHURCH (A parish of the Patriarchate of Moscow).
 August 8. OCA - The Lives of the Saints.
 The Autonomous Orthodox Metropolia of Western Europe and the Americas (ROCOR). St. Hilarion Calendar of Saints for the year of our Lord 2004. St. Hilarion Press (Austin, TX). p. 58.
 Menologion: The Eighth Day of the Month of August. Orthodoxy in China.
 August 8. Latin Saints of the Orthodox Patriarchate of Rome.
 The Roman Martyrology. Transl. by the Archbishop of Baltimore. Last Edition, According to the Copy Printed at Rome in 1914. Revised Edition, with the Imprimatur of His Eminence Cardinal Gibbons. Baltimore: John Murphy Company, 1916. pp. 236-237.
 Rev. Richard Stanton. A Menology of England and Wales, or, Brief Memorials of the Ancient British and English Saints Arranged According to the Calendar, Together with the Martyrs of the 16th and 17th Centuries. London: Burns & Oates, 1892. pp. 386-387.

 Greek Sources
 Great Synaxaristes:  8 ΑΥΓΟΥΣΤΟΥ. ΜΕΓΑΣ ΣΥΝΑΞΑΡΙΣΤΗΣ.
  Συναξαριστής. 8 Αυγούστου.'' ECCLESIA.GR. (H ΕΚΚΛΗΣΙΑ ΤΗΣ ΕΛΛΑΔΟΣ).

 Russian Sources
  21 августа (8 августа). Православная Энциклопедия под редакцией Патриарха Московского и всея Руси Кирилла (электронная версия). (Orthodox Encyclopedia - Pravenc.ru).

August in the Eastern Orthodox calendar